Tongjiang is a city of 160,000 in eastern Heilongjiang province, People's Republic of China, located at the confluence and on the right banks of the Songhua and Amur Rivers, the latter which marks the border with Russia. Administratively, it is a county-level city of Jiamusi.

Toponymy 
The city is also referred to by the Nanai toponym Lahasusu, which means "ancient house" in the Nanai language.

History

Ancient History 
During the Western Zhou (1045 BCE - 771 BCE), the area of present-day Tongjiang was inhabited by the Sushen people. Later, during the Qin and Han dynasties (221 BCE - 220 CE), the area was inhabited by the Yilou.

Early medieval history 

From 698 to 936, the kingdom of Balhae occupied northern Korea and parts of Manchuria and Primorsky Krai, consisting of the Nanai, the Udege, the Evenks, descendants of the Tungus-speaking people, and the people of the recently fallen Goguryeo kingdom of Korea. Sometime during the Sui or Tang dynasties (581 CE to 907 CE), the Wuji people disappeared from the area, and it became inhabited by Heishui Mohe tribes. These tribes were submitted to Balhae Kingdom under King Seon's reign (818-830).

King Seon administrated their territories by creating a prefecture in the neighbourhood: The  with Dalju, present-day Tongjiang, as its administrative centre.

20th century 
During the Sino-Soviet conflict in 1929, the Soviet Amur Military Flotilla defeated the Chinese Sungari Military Flotilla in the Battle of Lahasusu.

Administrative divisions 
Tongjiang administers 2 subdistricts, 6 towns, 4 townships, and 11 other township-level divisions.

Subdistricts 
The city's two subdistricts are Fanrong Subdistrict and Xinghua Subdistrict.

Towns 

Townships 

Other township-level divisions 
In addition to the aforementioned divisions, Tongjiang administers 11 other township-level divisions, comprising two tree farms, seven farms, one seed farm, and one ranch.

The city's two township-level tree farms are Jiejinkou Tree Farm and Yabei Tree Farm.

The city's sole seed farm is Tongjiang Seed Farm and Tongjiang Livestock Farm.

Demographics 
As of January 2022, Tongjiang is home to about 1,500 Nanai people, one of China's smallest recognized ethnic groups.

Climate

Transportation 

 China National Highway 221
 Jiansanjiang Airport

Tongjiang-Nizhneleninskoye railway bridge 

The Tongjiang-Nizhneleninskoye railway bridge was proposed in 2007 by Valery Solomonovich Gurevich, the vice-chairman of the Jewish Autonomous Oblast in Russia.  The railway bridge over the Amur River will connect Tongjiang with Nizhneleninskoye, a village in the Jewish Autonomous Oblast.

The Chinese portion of the bridge was finished in July 2016. Work began on the longer Russian section of the bridge in December 2016. Completion of structural link between the two sides of  the bridge was completed in March 2019. Opening to rail traffic has been repeatedly delayed, with the December 2019 estimate being "the end of 2020", and then 3rd quarter of 2021.

The bridge was completed in August 2021, and began undergoing tests in April 2022. Rostislav Goldstein, the current governor of the Jewish Autonomous Oblast, announced that he expected the bridge to be fully operational by August 20, 2022.

See also 

 China–Russia border
 Jiamusi
 List of Provinces of Balhae
 Nanai people

References

External links 
 Map of Tongjiang

 
Balhae
Cities in Heilongjiang
County level divisions of Heilongjiang
Jiamusi